The Boonwurrung language, also anglicised as Bunurong, Bun wurrung, and other variant spellings, is an Aboriginal Australian language traditionally spoken by the Boonwurrung people of the Kulin nation of central Victoria prior to European settlement in the colony of Victoria.  The last remaining traditional native speakers died in the early 20th century; however there is an active revival movement under way in the Boonwurrung community.

Geographic distribution 
Boonwurrung was spoken by six clans along the coast from the Werribee River, across the Mornington Peninsula, Western Port Bay to Wilsons Promontory.

Related languages 
Boonwurrung is closely related to the Woiwurrung language, with which it shares 93% of its vocabulary, and to a lesser degree with Taungurung spoken north of the Great Dividing Range in the area of the Goulburn River, with which it shares 80%.  Woiwurrung, Taungurong and Boonwurrung have been considered by linguists to be dialects of a single Central Victorian language, whose range stretched from almost Echuca in the north, to Wilsons Promontory in the south.

R. Brough Smyth wrote in 1878 that "The dialects of the Wooeewoorong or Wawoorong tribe (River Yarra) and the Boonoorong tribe (Coast) are the same. Twenty-three words out of thirty are, making allowances for differences of spelling and pronunciation, identical; five have evidently the same roots, and only two are widely different".

Placenames derived from Boonwurrung language terms

Animals and plants 
Some Boonwurrung words for animals and plants include:

Plants 
Banksia (Honeysuckle): Warrak

Buttercup: Gurm-burrut

Clematis aristata: Minamberang

Peppermint Tree: Wiyal

Sarsaparilla: Wadimalin

She-oak: Tur-run

Wattle: Garron

Woolly Tea-tree: Wulep

Yellow Box: Dhagurn

Yam Daisy: Murnong

Birds 
Black Cockatoo: Yanggai

Black Duck: Toolum

Black Swan: Gunuwarra

Emu: Barraimal

Ibis: Baibadjerruk

Magpie lark: Dit-dit

Nankeen Kestrel: Gawarn

Pelican: Wadjil

Quail: Tre-bin

Water Fowl: Kor-rung-un-un

Mammals 
Bandicoot: Bung

Fat tailed possum: Dunnart Barruth

Dingo: Yirrangin

Grey Kangaroo: Djimbanggur

Quoll (native cat): Yurn

Red Kangaroo: Quoim

Ring-tailed Possum: Bamu

Sugar Glider: Warran

Aquatic animals 
Blackfish: Duat

Cockle: Mur-yoke

Eel: Yuk / Ilk

Flathead: Dalum

Frog: Ngarrert

Mussel: Mur-bone

Oyster: U.yoke

Periwinkle: Pid-de-ron

Shark: Darrak

Stingray: Barbewor

Tadpole: Poorneet

Whale: Betayil

Insects 
Ant: Booran

Bee: Murnalong

Butterfly: Balam-balam

Fly: Garragarrak

References

Kulin languages
Extinct languages of Victoria (Australia)
Languages extinct in the 1900s